Fahai, born Pei Wende, was a monk who lived in Tang dynasty, and was identified as a compiler of Zen Buddhism according to the Dun-huang edition of the Platform Sutra. Fahai was a disciple of the Six Patriarch of Zen Buddhism, Hui-neng.

Biography 
Fahai was the son of Tang chancellor Pei Xiu, and the secular name of Fahai was Pei Wende. The young Pei Wende was sent by his father to Laoshan (Hunan province) to practice Zen Buddhism. Fahai's father, the then court chancellor donated to build Miyin Temple (located in Ningxiang County, Hunan Province). The Miyin Temple host gave the Pei Wende a Buddhist name "Fahai". Fahai's master, Master Lingyou ordered ascetic practice every day. Fahai spent nearly three years cutting firewood, and delivered water for more than five hundred monks for nearly three years.

Soon after, the ascetic life of Zen Master Fahai came to a successful end and he began a three-year meditation. Master Lingyou went to the door to call the name "Fahai". The Zen master came out from his meditation room, and the doors and windows of the closed room were not damaged, which was a sign of perfection.  After Fahai achieved enlightenment after three-year of meditation, the master was instructed to travel to Lushan, Jiangxi and other places, and finally resided in the Fu Mountain in Zhenjiang, Jiangsu. From the information given by local people, there was a dojo called Zexin Temple from East Jin dynasty. Therefore, the master Fahai burned a section and vowed to rebuild the dojo and samghārama for all beings. So he started digging fields and working hard, and gradually won the support of the local people and began to build temples. At Zhenjiang, he helped locals with cultivation and gradually won the support of local people and began to build temples.

Achievements 
During a foundation excavation, a batch of gold was accidentally excavated, and Fahai decided to turn it over to Zhenjiang prefecture. The prefecture reported this matter to Emperor Tang Xuanzong, the emperor was deeply moved and ordered that gold be allocated directly to the temple as court support for construction. The emperor names the temple Jinshan Temple. Fahai became the first Zen master resided at Jinshan (Gold Mountain) Temple.
Before the temple was built, the Zen master had been meditating in a cave next to Jinshan Temple, and later became a well-known Zen cave. When the Jinshan Temple was successfully completed in the end, it became the largest Zen Buddhism Temple in the Jiangnan region, and master Fahai was also called the "Kaishan Pei Zu" (honourable founder) of Jinshan Temple.

Historically, Master Fahai was known by his enlightenment through asceticism practice and was admired by people throughout Jiangsu.

As a patriarch of Zen Buddhism, Fahai was one of the editors of the Platform Sutra. Fahai contributed to the translation of the sutra and left editing notes in his version of the translation and warned haphazard transmission. A famous dialogue between Faai and the sixth patriarch Hui-Neng was recorded in the Platform Sutra:"The mind has always been the buddha, before I understood I deceived myself, knowing now how mediation and wisdom work, I cultivate both and transcend all things."

Anecdotes

Legend of the White Snake 

The Legend of the White Snake has historical archetypes, of which there are two versions. One way of saying this is according to the "Jinshanzhi" record:  There is a python cave, the side of the right front, is so treacherous and dangerous, and enters the depth of four or five feet. The white python came out to eat people. When Fahai came to Zhenjiang for the first time, the old temple was torn down and overgrown with weeds. A white python from the middle of the cliff often came out and hurt people. Fahai drove the white python into the river without harming others.

Another version of this story has something to do with Jinshan Temple, but not Fahai himself. According to the Record of the High Monk, more than eighty years before Fahai came to Zhenjiang, there was a high monk named Lingtan who was the nephew of Empress Wu. He had once been a prince and later became a monk. Lingtan once drove a white python in the python cave of Jinshan. Later, people integrated these people and tales related to Jinshan Temple and Fahai which made up fiction, then the Legend of the White Snake gradually became a household story.

Leifeng Pagoda

In the legend of Leifeng Pagoda and the White Snake, monk Fahai was linked to being the guardian of the pagoda.

Leifeng Pagoda was mostly known due to the love story between the White Snake (Bai Niangzi) and Xu Xian. In the historical records and literary works about Leifeng Pagoda, the character Xu Xian was called "Xu Xuan" in Ming and Qing novels and was not "renamed" to Xu Xian until the middle of the Republic of China. When Leifeng pagoda was built there was not a story of the white snake. After the Wu dynasty was descended from the Song dynasty, the storytellers gradually evolved this legendary story. The outline of the story is basically consistent with the current legends, except that Xu Xian was renamed. Feng Menglong from Ming dynasty recorded one of the earliest and more complete versions of the White Snake legend.

The records in Feng Menglong's "Jing Shi Heng Yan", Xu Xian and Bai Niangzi (the white snake) met Master Fahai from Jinshan Temple by the dock at the West Lake, Hangzhou. Fahai became a figure in this legend. Fahai in Feng Menglong's writing is a positive figure and a monk with good morals. Later, in the version of the local drama "White Snake", Fahai was gradually shaped into a negative image that departed the couple, and eventually became a hypocritical spokesperson.

Jinshan Temple in the Legend of the White Snake is located at Hangzhou where the story took place. Historically, the connection between Zhenjiang and Hangzhou has been quite frequent. During the Song and Ming dynasties, people who travelled along the Yangtze River to Hangzhou always took Zhenjiang as a transit point and a rest stop. At that time, Hangzhou, which was famous for silk and tea, was economic prosperity. Folk storytellers at the time pulled things familiar to the travellers into the content of the storytelling, Fahai in Jinshan Temple was then connected to Leifeng Pagoda.

Fahai's figure 

According to the historical record, there was a Fahai in the Tang dynasty, who lived in the Jinshan Temple. In the cave which the master meditated, there was a python. Because Master Fahai possessed great virtues and morals, the python retreated and left. At this stage, in the context of the Tang dynasty, he was a Zen master who helped built Jinshan Temple and respected by people.

In the novel of Feng Menglong from the late Ming dynasty, Fahai as a prototype in the story of had changed, and the recorded historical story was changed through folktales. Fahai in Feng Menglong's novel was still a positive image. Until modern times, many people still have the impression that Fahai is a life-saving monk.

Since the 20th century of student movements until contemporary, "anti-feudalism" became mainstream advocacy of society. One of the values of "anti-feudalism" is a tribute to freedom of love and marriage. Fahai as a figure in widespread folk dramas “White Snake”, became a symbol of feudal forces. The famous Chinese author Lu Xun criticised that Leifeng Pagoda was going to fall, and he also believed that it was a symbol of the feudal system and hindered the free love between young men and women.

As the story of the White Snake is widespread, the Xiang Opera, Han Opera, Sichuan Opera, Hui Opera, Yunnan Opera, Yu Opera, Cantonese Opera, Ping Opera, Hebei Xunzi, Qin Qiang and Qingping Opera all have this repertoire. Different perceptions of Fahai were received by people from different regions. As of the contemporary time, Fahai as a figure appeared in legends and novels adapted television works. In terms of literary and artistic creation, Fahai as a fictional figure is distant from his historical figure as a Buddhist monk.

References

Citations

Sources 

 
 
 
 
 
 

Year of birth unknown
Tang dynasty Buddhist monks